This article lists people who have been featured on the postage stamps of Costa Rica. Note that many of these people have been featured on multiple stamps. The following entries list the name of the person, a short description of their notability, and the first year they were first featured on a stamp.

The list is complete through 2022.

A 
Julio Acosta, president of Costa Rica, 1920-24 (1921)
Francisco Aguilar B.,  president of Costa Rica, 1919-20 (1980)
Manuel Aguilar, president of Costa Rica, 1837-38 (1943, 1961)
Alfonso Acosta Guzmán, promoter of forensic medicine (2015)
José María Alfaro Zamora, president of Costa Rica, 1842–44, 1846-47 (1943, 1961)
Alejandro Alvarado Garcia, president of the Costa Rica Court of Justice (1992)
Felipe J. Alvarado, Founder of Rotary Club Costa Rica (1977)
:es:Pablo de Alvarado y Bonilla, doctor, Costa Rican politician and Independence leader (1971)
Andrey Amador, cyclist (2011)
Alonso de Anguciana de Gamboa, governor of Costa Rica (1977)
Manuel José Arce, general and president of the Federal Republic of Central America (1971)
Oscar Arias, Nobel Peace prize winner and president of Costa Rica 1986-90 (1987)
Ricardo Saprissa Ayma, president of the Saprissa Soccer Club (1985)

B 
Amelia Barquero, composer (2018)
Fernando Baudrit Solera, president of the Costa Rica Court of Justice (1992)
Benedict XVI, pope of the Catholic church (2005)
Amadeo Quiros Blanco, comptroller of General Audit Office (1976)
Simón Bolívar, South American liberator (1921)
Leon Fernandez Bonilla, founder of the National Archives (1981)
Alberto Brenes Cordoba, lawyer and judge (1961)
Nery Brenes, sprinter (2011)
Leonidas Briceno B.,  doctor (1965)

C 
R. A. Calderón Guardia, president of Costa Rica, 1940-44 (1993)
Joaquín Bernardo Calvo, politician (1957)
Jose Maria Cañas, Costa Rican military figure (1903, 1907, 1910, 1957)
Rodrigo Carazo Odio, president of Costa Rica, 1978-82 (1968)
Braulio Carrillo, president of Costa Rica, 1835–37, 1838-42 (1901, 1907, 1910)
Recaredo Bonilla Carrillo, postmaster (1963)
Bruno Carranza, president of Costa Rica, 1870 (1943)
Francisca Carrasco, first woman in Costa Rican military (2016)
Pancha Carrasco, hero of independence campaign (1984)
Ramon Castilla y Marquesado, president of Peru (1957)
Florencio del Castillo, Costa Rican cleric and politician (1971)
Juana de Castillo, first lady and wife of José Maria Castro (1996)
Jose María Castro, president of Costa Rica, 1847–49, 1866-68 (1901, 1907, 1943)
Miguel Angel Castro Carazo, educator and humanitarian (1993)
Sandra Cauffman, electrical engineer, physicist and NASA official (2017)
Edith Cavell, nurse (1945)
Manuel Antonio de la Cerda, Nicaraguan politician (1971)
Miguel de Cervantes, Spanish author (1947)
Jesus Bonilla Chavarria, composer (1984)
Franklin Chang-Diaz, astronaut (2003)
Felicitas Chaverri, head of Department of Drugs and Narcotics (2019)
Rafael A. Chaves, Costa Rican Composer (1974)
Roberto Chiari, president of Panama (1963)
Laura Chinchilla, president of Costa Rica, 2010-14 (2011)
Christopher Columbus, explorer (1923)
José Company, composer (2018)
A. Cruz, Olympic swim team member (1996)
Shirley Cruz, soccer player (2017)

D 
Luis Davila Solera, president of the Costa Rica Court of Justice (1992)
José Matias Delgado, leader in the independence movement of El Salvador (1971)
Jorge Manuel Dengo, vice-president of Costa Rica (2013)
Omar Dengo, educator (1988)

E 
Mario Echandi Jiménez, president of Costa Rica, 1958-62 (1981)
Aquileo J. Echeverria, writer (2016)
Albert Einstein, physicist (2005)
Aniceto Esquivel, president of Costa Rica, 1876 (1946)
Ascensión Esquivel Ibarra, president of Costa Rica, 1902-06 (1947)

F 
Justo A. Facio, professor (1960)
Carlos Luis Fallas, author (2009)
Gonzalo Fernandez de Oviedo, first chronicler of Spanish Indies (1978)
Juan Mora Fernández, president of Costa Rica, 1824–33, 1837 (1901, 1907, 1910, 1943)
Mauro Fernández, statesman (1907, 1910, 1943, 2018)
Pacifica Fernández, first lady and wife of Juan Mora (1996)
Prospero Fernández, general and president of Costa Rica, 1882-85 (1883, 1946)
Valeriano Fernández, philosopher (2019)
José Figueres Ferrer, president, 1970-74 (1998, 2006)
Christiana Figueres, diplomat (2017)
Eusebio Figueroa, politician (1903)
Edward J. Flanagan, priest and founder of Boys Town (1959)
Julio Fonseca, Costa Rican composer (1974)
Saint Francis of Assisi, Italian Catholic friar, deacon, mystic, and preacher (1983)
Pope Francis, head of the Roman Catholic Church (2014)

G 
Hanna Gabriel, boxer (2011)
Jose R. de Gallegos, president of Costa Rica, 1833–35, 1845-46 (1943)
Fidel Gamboa, composer (2018)
Mohandas Karamchand Gandhi, leader of India's Independence Movement (1998)
Eduardo Garnier, sports promoter (1974)
Juan Jose Ulloa Giralt, doctor (1961)
Alfredo González Flores, lawyer and president of Costa Rica, 1914-17 (1964)
Cleto Gonzalez Viquez, president of Costa Rica, 1906–10, 1928-32 (1941, 1947, 1959)
Carmen Granados, humorist (1999)
Tomas Guardia, president of Costa Rica, 1870–1876, 1877-82 (1943)
Tomás Soley Güell, economist and historian (1974)
Fernando Centeno Güell, poet and educator (2008)
Agustin Gutierrez L.,  lawyer (1961)
Benjamin Gutierrez, composer, conductor and pianist (1984)
Manuel M. Gutierrez, Costa Rican composer (1923)

H 
Paul Harris (Rotary), founder of Rotary International (1977)
Dionisio de Herrera, head of state of Honduras and head of state of Nicaragua (1971)
Rubén Odio H.,  archbishop of San José (1962)
Vicente Herrera Zeledón, president of Costa Rica, 1876-77 (1946, 1961)
Rowland Hill, postal reformer and originator of the postage stamp (1979)

I 
Isabella I of Spain, queen of Spain (1952)

J 
Jesús Jiménez, president of Costa Rica, 1863–66, 1868–70, 1932-36 (1901, 1907, 1910, 1923)
Ricardo Jimenez Oreamuno, president of Costa Rica, 1910–14, 1924-28 (1947, 1959)
Pilar Jimenez, composer (1984)
John Paul II, pope of the Roman Catholic Church (2003)

K 
John Fitzgerald Kennedy, US president (1963)
John F. Kennedy Jr.,  son of US president (1965)
Robert Koch, German physician and microbiologist (1982)

L 
Roman Macaya Lahmann, aviation pioneer (1988)
Antonio Larrazabal, Guatemalan priest and diplomat (1971)
Miguel Larreinaga, Nicaraguan philosopher, humanist, lawyer and poet (1971)
Charles Lindbergh, aviator (2003)
Juan Manuel Lopez del Corral, priest (1982)
St Louisa de Marillac, co-founder, with Vincent de Paul, of the Daughters of Charity (1960)
Carmen Lyra, author (1998)

M 
Casiano de Madrid, priest (1965)
:es:Rodrigo Arias Maldonado, Spanish military officer (1924)
Nelson Mandela, president of South Africa (2015)
Alberto Martén, economist, Solidarity Movement founder (2009)
Jose Marti, Cuban poet and national hero (1995)
Julio Mata, Costa Rican composer (1974)
Roberto Brenes Mesen, educator and writer (1974)
Luis Molina, ambassador (1957)
Pedro Molina, Guatemalan politician (1971)
Alejandro Monestal, Costa Rican composer (1974)
J. García Monge, writer and educator (1981)
Luis Alberto Monge Alvarez, president of Costa Rica, 1982-86 (1968)
Jose M. Montealegre, president of Costa Rica, 1959-63 (1945)
Alberto M. Brenes Mora, botanist (1961)
Manuel Mora, social guarantee leader (1993)
Jose Joaquin Mora, hero of independence campaign (1957, 1984)
Juan Rafael Mora, president of Costa Rica, 1849-59 (1901, 1907, 1921, 1931, 1943, 1957, 1984)
Francisco Morazán, president of Costa Rica, 1842 (1943)

N 
Carmen Naranjo, writer (2019)
Florence Nightingale, nurse (1945)
Alfred Nobel, industrialist and founder of the Nobel Peace Prize (2007)
Solon Nunez Frutos, public health pioneer (1992)

O 
Miguel Obregon L.,  educator and founder of the national library system (1961)
Alberto Montes de Oca D.,  champion sharpshooter (1974)
Eunice Odio, poet (2019)
Daniel Oduber Quiros, president of Costa Rica, 1974-78 (1986)
Eusebio Figueroa Oreamuno, politician (1907, 1910)
Francisco Maria Oreamuno, president of Costa Rica, 1844 (1943, 1957)
Yolanda Oreamuno, writer (2016)
Francisco J. Orlich Bolmarcich, president of Costa Rica, 1962-66 (1963, 1986)

P 
María París, Olympic swim team member (1996)
José Francisco de Peralta, priest and politician (1960)
Pedro Pérez Zeledón, jurist and diplomat (1982)
Juana Pereira, peasant woman who inspired First Church of Our Lady of the Angels (1977)
Clodomiro Picado, developer of antivenins (2019)
Teodoro Picado Michalski, president of Costa Rica, 1944-48 (1981)
Oscar J. Pinto F.,  soccer introducer (1974)
Henri François Pittier, founder of the National Geographic Institute (1989)
Max Planck, physicist (2005)
Claudia Poll, Olympic swim team member (1996)
Silvia Poll, Olympic swim team member (1996)

Q 
José Manuel Quirós y Blanco, general and national hero (1957)

R 
Domingo Rivas, vicar of the Cathedral of San Jose (1978)
F. Rivas, Olympic swim team member (1996)
Julio Rivera, president of El Salvador (1963)
Jose Rodriguez, president of Costa Rica, 1890-94 (1941)
Miguel Angel Rodriguez, president of the Organization of American States (2004 )
Abelardo Rojas, founder of the cornea bank (1981)
Elias Rojas Roman, doctor (1961)
Franklin Delano Roosevelt, US president (1947)
Nicolaas Rubens, Lord of Rameyen, son of painter Peter Paul Rubens (1962)
Bryan Ruiz, soccer player (2011)

S 
Andrés Sáenz Llorente, medical doctor (1961)
Caridad Salazar, children's writer (2018)
José de San Martin, soldier, independence leader and statesman (1978)
Víctor M. Sanabria Martínez, priest and social guarantees leader (1993)
Juan Santamaría, national hero (1901, 1907, 1910, 1957, 1984)
Benito Serrano Jimenez, president of the Costa Rica Court of Justice (1992)
Luis Somoza, president of Nicaragua (1963)
Bernardo Soto Alfaro, doctor and president of Costa Rica, 1885-90 (1887, 1889, 1946)
Heinrich von Stephan, founder of the Universal Postal Union (1981)
Antonio José Sucre, Venezuelan independence leader (1995)

T 
Bernardo A. Theil, bishop (1948)
Federico Tinoco G.,  dictator of Costa Rica, 1917-19 (1980)
Jose Joaquin Trejos Fernandez, president of Costa Rica, 1966-70 (1986)
Esteban Lorenzo de Tristan, priest (1982)

U 
Otilio Ulate Blanco, president of Costa Rica, 1949-53 (1981)
Juan José Ulloa Giralt, medical doctor (1961)
Guadalupe Urbina, composer (2018)

V 
Antonio Vallerriestra, military officer (1957)
José Cecilio del Valle, philosopher, politician, lawyer, and journalist of Honduras (1971)
Carlos Luis Valverde, doctor (1950)
Joaquin Vargas Calvo, Costa Rican composer (1974)
Ramón Villeda Morales, president of Honduras (1963)
St Vincent de Paul, saint and chaplain to the poor (1960)
Julián Volio, politician (1903, 1907, 1910)

W

X

Y 
Miguel Ydigoras, president of Guatemala (1963)
R. Yglesias, Olympic swim team member (1996)
Rafael Yglesias Castro, president of Costa Rica, 1894-1902 (1947, 1948)

Z 
José Maria Zeledon Brenes, composer of the national anthem (1980)
Jose Daniel Zuniga Zeledon, musician (1984)

Sources 

 Scott Standard Postage Stamp Catalogue, Volume 2A, ©2021, Amos Media Co., Sidney, OH
 Stanley Gibbons Stamp Catalogue, Part 15, 3rd Edition, © 2007, Stanley Gibbons Inc.
 Michel Übersee-Katalog Band 3: Südamerika ©2001, Schwaneberger Verlag GMBH
 Costa Rica Postal Catalog, Third Edition ©2004, Hector A. Mena, Society for Costa Rica Collectors

Costa Rica, List of people on stamps of
Stamps
Philately of Costa Rica
Stamps
Stamps